The Torcuato Di Tella University (Universidad Torcuato Di Tella, commonly referred to as UTDT or La Di Tella) is a non-profit private university founded in 1991. Located Buenos Aires, Argentina, it is focused primarily on social sciences.

The undergraduates majors available are economics, business economics, digital technologies, business administration, law, political science, international relations, social sciences, history, architecture and design. The university also offers over 34 graduate programs.

The faculty comprises more than 70 full-time professors, most of them alumni from universities abroad. The university provides more than 50 exchange programs with universities in Europe, North America, South America, Australia, Africa and Asia. There is also a sizable number of international students that study in the university for a semester or two. The university's President is Juan José Cruces.

History

Background and foundation
The concept of the new university was developed by the university's first dean, Gerardo della Paolera, and the then Argentine ambassador to the United States, Guido di Tella.  They decided to adopt an American university model, and to create a research based university with small class sizes and professors with international studies and recognition.

Universidad Torcuato Di Tella was founded in 1991, with the mission of educating new generations of academic, business, social and political leaders. It was founded by the Torcuato di Tella Foundation, making use of the experience and resources of the Torcuato di Tella Institute. The latter, a non-profit institute founded in 1958 to promote research in the scientific, cultural and artistic development of Argentina, became a leading local center for avant-garde art during the 1960s. The establishments' namesake, Torcuato di Tella, had been a leading Argentine industrialist through his Siam di Tella conglomerate founded in 1911.

It began offering undergraduate studies in economics in 1992, but has since expanded and started offering undergraduate courses in business economics, political sciences, international studies, law, history, architecture and business administration, as well as numerous graduate degrees.

Gerardo della Paolera was president of Universidad Torcuato Di Tella from its foundation until 2001, when he was replaced by the economist Juan Pablo Nicolini. Nicolini was reelected to the presidency in 2005, continued in the position until September 2010, as he was ineligible for reelection to the post due to term limits established by the university's charter. The reputed sociologist and political analyst Manuel Mora y Araujo was designated president in 2009 until his resignation in May 2011 due to personal reasons. Ernesto Schargrodsky, dean of the Business School, was subsequently named president. He was subsequently re-elected in 2014 to serve a full four-year term.

In May 2019, after his two four-year terms, Schargrodsky was replaced by the economist Juan José Cruces, director of the Research on Finance Center and former dean of the Business Schoolwho was reelected for a second four-year term.

Move to the Figueroa Alcorta campus
In March 2013, Universidad Torcuato di Tella moved to a new building on Avenue Figueroa Alcorta. The 13,700 m2 building is a redeveloped waterworks building was constructed between 1937 and 1942. It was put up for a tender in 1998 after Obras Sanitarias de la Nación was privatized, for which the university submitted the winning bid. The winning design was by a group of architects led by architects Clorindo Testa, Juan Fontana, Juan Barros Tomé and Horacio Rodrigo.

Works on the building had begun in 2002 and the business school had been working from this campus since 2004 on 1,200m2.

The university in its entirety runs from this campus since 2013, and it has been extended twice and a green terrace was opened on its roof with views of the Rio de La Plata. From 2011 to 2018, the number of students has tripled, putting pressure on the university's infrastructure. In order to cater for the continued growth of the university, plans were made to construct a new building, which would be able to house an additional 1,000 students.

In December 2015, a competition was held to select the design of the building, which was won by Spanish architect Josep Ferrando, who proposed a modern building with an industrial style and allows for a flexible use of its space. The nine-floor building, with 11,646m² of surface space and an LEED certification, was inaugurated in March 2019 with Argentine vice-president Gabriela Michetti and the deputy mayor of Buenos Aires, Diego Santilli in attendance.

In 2022, due to the continued growth of the university, a new international architectural competition was held for the New Parque Building and a new Central Piazza. The winning design was by the BRUTHER studio in Paris.

Notable graduates
Javier Milei, Marcos Peña, Nicolás Dujovne, Hernán Lacunza, Nicolás Massot, Carlos Melconian, Santiago Cafiero, Hernán Lorenzino, Paula Forteza, and Iván Werning are some of the university's most important graduates.

Ranking
According to the QS World University Rankings, La Di Tella is among the second best private universities in the country and is ranked first in Buenos Aires.

Business School

The Business School in Universidad Torcuato Di Tella has 20 full-time faculty and offers a bachelor's degree in Business Economics, an MBA, an Executive MBA and a Masters in Finance, as well as numerous executive education programs.

Since 2010, the Chilean business magazine America Economia has ranked Universidad Torcuato Di Tella among the top 10 business schools in Latin America.

The MBA program taught by the university is accredited by the London-based Association of MBAs (AMBA).

Courses offered

Universidad Torcuato Di Tella offers undergraduate degrees in the following fields:
 Economics
 Business Economics
 Business Administration
 Political Science
 International Studies
 Social Studies
 Law
 History
 Architecture
 Design
 Digital Technology

The following graduate degree courses are offered:
 PhD in Political Science and Government
 PhD in International Relations
 PhD in History
 MBA
 Executive MBA
 Masters in Finance
 Masters in History
 Masters in Economics
 Masters in Applied Economics
 Masters in Management and Analytics
 Masters in Econometrics
 Masters in Political Science
 Masters in Law and Economics
 Masters in Tax Law
 Masters in Criminal Law
 Masters in Urban Economics
 Masters in History and Culture of Architecture and the City
 Masters in International Studies
 Masters in Public Policy
 Masters in Education Management
 Masters in Education Policy
 Masters in Journalism (in association with La Nación)

It also offers specialization studies in the management of education, educational policy, tax law, criminal law, architecture and technology, architecture and the landscape, preservation and conservation of heritage, advanced economics, econometrics and the management of NGOs (in association with Universidad de San Andrés and CEDES), as well as executive business education.

Faculty

Universidad Torcuato Di Tella has 110 regular professors, of which 80 are full-time researchers, divided in nine departments:
 School of Law
 School of Business
 School of Government
 Department of Economics
 Department of Political Science and International Studies
 Department of Historical and Social Sciences
 Department of Mathematics and Statistics
 School of Architecture and Urban Studies
 Department of Art

Political scientist Natalio R. Botana, historian and economist Pablo Gerchunoff, sociologist and Peronism scholar Juan Carlos Torre, architect Jorge Liernur and historian Ezequiel Gallo are Emeritus professors. Historian Tulio Halperín Donghi, Economist Ana María Martirena-Mantel, and Nobel Laureate Finn Kydland are honorary professors.

Research centers

Universidad Torcuato Di Tella has opened the following centers: the Center for Financial Research, the Entrepreneurship and New Business Development Center, the International Studies Center, the Crime, Institutions and Policy Research Laboratory and the Center for the Evaluation and Study in Social Economics for Poverty Relief.

The Center for Financial Research publishes the Consumer Confidence Index, the Inflation Expectations Index, and the Leader Index, that aims to identify changes in the economic cycle.

The Crime, Institutions and Policy Research Laboratory publishes a Victimization Index, which measures the percentage of people who have been victims of crimes in the previous 12 months.

ENI DI TELLA(Inclusive Businesses Think Tank of the Torcuato Di Tella University according to its Spanish acronym) is a think tank that promotes the development of inclusive businesses by creating and spreading knowledge and experiences. Given its mission, ENI has published a number of academic papers and research studies in this field such as: First Survey of Inclusive Businesses in Argentina – Entrepreneurships and Small Enterprises (2012-2013); Characterizing Emerging Markets (2012), The Service Dominant Logic: A Conceptual Foundation to Address the Underserved (2012).

The university opened of the Torcuato Di Tella University Neuroscience Laboratory in 2014, which studies neuroscience and experimental psicology in an inter-disciplinary manner, with the presence of Lino Barañao, the Minister of Science, Technology and Productive Innovation of Argentina. The dean called the event "a first step in the development of hard sciences" for the university. Mariano Sigman is the director of the Laboratory, which has thirteen researchers.

Library

Universidad Torcuato Di Tella's library is concentrated in the social sciences. It was founded with Torcuato Di Tella's private collection and has since grown with the scientific activity of both the Torcuato Di Tella Institute and the Torcuato Di Tella University.

The library has over 95,000 books, over 2,500 newspaper collections, and 6,000 digital documents. It has a collection of  original editions dating as far back as the 17th century and access to numerous online databases. It has recently opened use of its online catalogue to the general public.

The Di Tella library includes the Max Hartwell, Carlos Escudé, Christiaan Huygens and Fernando Nadra collections. It also includes a collection of documents of trade unions in Argentina.

Art collection and classes

Following in the tradition of the Torcuato di Tella Institute, Universidad Torcuato Di Tella hosts a modern art collection, and in 2004, inaugurated a former water company building refurbished by architect Clorindo Testa as its new center for visual arts. The core of its collection is the Edward Shaw and Maria Padilla de Shaw collection, which has 100 paintings of contemporary artists including Antonio Berni, Guillermo Kuitca, Antonio Seguí, Luis Fernando Benedit and Emilio Torti. The collection is constantly on exhibition in the university's two buildings.

Also in the tradition of the Di Tella Institute, the university has numerous prestigious art programs and workshops. Every year, 12 artists are awarded Kuitka scholarships, which allows them to meet with modern artist Guillermo Kuitca once a week to discuss their artwork.

As of April 2013, the university was studying the possibility of using this infrastructure to launch a bachelor's degree in Art.

See also
Siam di Tella

References

External links
 Official website
 Audio recordings of Professor Juan Pablo Nicolini at the three-part workshop on "Poverty & Growth: Reflections on Latin America" held at the University of Chicago: "Growth: Evidence and Sources" - Session 1; "Poverty and Economic Development" - Session 2; "Reflections on Argentina" - Session 3.

Education in Buenos Aires
Torcuato di Tella
Educational institutions established in 1991
Universities in Buenos Aires Province
1991 establishments in Argentina